The 2019 Utah Utes football team represented the University of Utah during the 2019 NCAA Division I FBS football season. The Utes were led by 15th-year head coach Kyle Whittingham and played their home games at Rice–Eccles Stadium in Salt Lake City. They competed as members of the South Division of the Pac-12 Conference.

Previous season 
The Utes finished the 2018 season 9–5, 6–3 in Pac-12 play to win the South Division. In the Pac-12 Championship game, they lost to No. 10-ranked Washington. They received an invitation to the Holiday Bowl where they lost to Northwestern.

Utah announced in January 2019 that Andy Ludwig would be returning to the school as offensive coordinator, replacing Troy Taylor, who left to take the head coaching job at Sacramento State. Ludwig had been head coach Kyle Whittingham's first offensive coordinator at Utah from 2005 to 2008, a tenure which included the Utes' undefeated 2008 season. He had served the previous six seasons as the offensive coordinator at Vanderbilt.

Preseason

Pac-12 media days

Pac-12 media poll
In the 2019 Pac-12 media poll, Utah was voted as the favorite to win both the South Division and the Pac–12 Championship Game.

Schedule
Utah's 2019 schedule will begin on Thursday, August 29 on the road against rival BYU, a football independent. They will round out their non-conference slate with home games against Northern Illinois of the Mid-American Conference and Idaho State of the Big Sky Conference. In Pac-12 Conference play, the Utes will play the other members of the South Division and draw California, Oregon State, Washington, and Washington State from the North Division. They will not play Oregon or Stanford as part of the regular season.

Source:

Rankings

Game summaries

at BYU

Northern Illinois

Idaho State

at USC

Washington State

at Oregon State

Arizona State

California

at Washington

UCLA

at Arizona

Colorado

vs. Oregon (Pac-12 Championship Game)

vs. Texas (Alamo Bowl)

Players drafted into the NFL

References

Utah
Utah Utes football seasons
Utah Utes football